Warszewice may refer to the following places in Poland:
 Warszewice, Kuyavian-Pomeranian Voivodeship
 Warszewice, Łódź Voivodeship